"Ne reviens pas" is a song by French artists Gradur and Heuss l'Enfoiré. Released in November 2019, the song peaked at number-one on the French Singles Chart.

Charts

Weekly charts

Year-end charts

References

2019 singles
2019 songs
SNEP Top Singles number-one singles 
French-language songs